Doubravice nad Svitavou is a market town in Blansko District in the South Moravian Region of the Czech Republic. It has about 1,400 inhabitants.

Notable people
Jan Kunc (1883–1976), composer and pedagogue

References

Populated places in Blansko District
Market towns in the Czech Republic